Patiria is a genus of starfish in the family Asterinidae from the Pacific Ocean.

Species
Patiria contains the following species:

References

Asterinidae
Asteroidea genera
Taxa named by John Edward Gray